The Foreman of the Jury is a 1913 American short comedy film featuring Mabel Normand.

Cast
 Roscoe 'Fatty' Arbuckle
 Fred Mace
 Hank Mann
 Mabel Normand
 Ford Sterling

See also
 List of American films of 1913
 Fatty Arbuckle filmography
 Jury foreman

References

External links

1913 films
1913 comedy films
1913 short films
American silent short films
American black-and-white films
Films directed by Mack Sennett
Silent American comedy films
American comedy short films
1910s American films